Association des sports de glace de Tours is a former French ice hockey team based in Tours. The team was champion of Magnus league in 1980 and folded in 2010. The team was also known as "Diables noirs de Tours" (Tours Black Devils).

The team was founded in 1972 and played home games at the Patinoire municipale de Tours.

Notable players

 Mike Clarke
 Devon Smith
 Brendon Smith
 Philippe Ringuette
 Thomas Sychterz
 Michaël Tessier
 Jason D'Ascanio
 

 Lukas Krejci
 Roman Novotny

 Alon Eizenman

 Adam Russo

 Sebastian Wachowski

 Peter Lietava
 Vladimir Sabol

External links
 Official website 

Ice hockey teams in France
Sport in Tours, France
1972 establishments in France
2010 disestablishments in France
Ice hockey clubs established in 1972
Ice hockey clubs disestablished in 2010